The 2009 Saipan shootings were a spree shooting that took place on the United States commonwealth island of Saipan in the Northern Mariana Islands.

Shootings 
The gunman opened fire in two locations across the island of Saipan. His first location was Kannat Tabla, where he shot and killed four people (two men, a four-year-old boy, and a two-year-old girl) at a shooting range at 11:21 a.m. A four-year-old girl, who was the daughter of one of the slain men and also the older sister of the deceased girl, was also shot in the chest, but she survived her injury. He then drove several miles to Marpi, where about 60 people were taking pictures of the area. There, he fired his rifle at a group of South Korean tourists from inside his van, wounding five of them, two of whom were children.

From there, he traveled to the popular tourist destination Last Command Post Park, which was the location of Japan's last base for military commanders during World War II. There, he set his van on fire and then walked to the edge of Banzai Cliff, firing along the way. Upon arriving along the edge of the cliff, he committed suicide by shooting himself in the head with his rifle as police closed in. A search of the van's remains recovered three additional rifles and more than 750 rounds of ammunition. The shootings lasted for an approximate half-hour.

Victims 
Five people (including the gunman) were killed and nine others were injured. All of the deceased victims, as well as one of the injured, were residents of Saipan, while the others were visiting from South Korea; it is not believed that the tourists were specifically targeted. They are:

Killed 
Enrique Naputi, 30
Richard Borja, 22
Vince Rosario, 5
Korina Naputi, 1
Li Zhongren, 42 (gunman)

Injured 
Dolores Naputi, 4
Park Jae-hyung, 39
Seven unnamed tourists

Perpetrator 
The gunman was identified as 42-year-old Li Zhongren, who was employed at the Kannat Tabla shooting range as a contract worker. He was also living at the shooting range at the time of the shootings. It had been reported that he left a suicide note behind detailing his motive as a "business deal gone bad". Police officials believed that the shootings, reported as premeditated, were sparked by a frustration over financial issues.

Reactions 
The Governor of the Northern Mariana Islands Benigno Fitial said of the shooting, "My heart and prayers go out to the families and friends of the victims in today's shooting and most especially to those that were fatally wounded. The commonwealth has never experienced a tragic situation like this, and we are saddened by the appalling action of a single individual that has caused so much harm to our peaceful island community." Saipan Congressman Gregorio Sablan also commented, "The security we take for granted in our island homes has been broken by this senseless act of violence." Lieutenant Governor of the Northern Mariana Islands, Eloy Inos, told reporters, "This is an unfortunate but isolated incident. It happened for reasons unbeknownst to us, but we can handle this type of situation." Following the announcement that South Korean tourists were among the injured, this led to fears that tourism rates would drop at Saipan. Schools across the island were shut down for the day for safety reasons.

References 

2009 active shooter incidents in the United States
Spree shootings in the United States
2009 mass shootings in the United States
Mass shootings in the United States
Mass murder in 2009
Mass murder in the United States
2009 murders in the United States
Murder–suicides in the United States
Deaths by firearm in the Northern Mariana Islands
Drive-by shootings
Saipan
Crimes in the Northern Mariana Islands
November 2009 crimes in the United States
2009 in the Northern Mariana Islands
Suicides by firearm in the Northern Mariana Islands